Garath is the given name of:

Garath Archer (born 1974), former English rugby union footballer
Garath McCleary (born 1987), English professional footballer
Belgarath the Sorcerer (fictional), a major character in The Belgariad by David Eddings, originally named Garath, his name is altered later on in his youth.

See also
Düsseldorf-Garath, a quarter in Düsseldorf Germany
Gareth (given name)
Garry (disambiguation)
Gary (disambiguation)
Garaidh

Masculine given names